Hugh McClelland may refer to:
 Hugh McClelland (politician)
 Hugh McClelland (cartoonist)